is a sequel to the games, anime, and manga franchise of Galaxy Angel, and is the continuation of BROCCOLI's Project G.A.. It features a brand new cast of Angels called the Rune Angel Troupe, and according to the game Galaxy Angel II: Zettai Ryōiki no Tobira, is set 4 years after the end of the previous game, Galaxy Angel: Eternal Lovers.

In this sequel, due to the development of a method to cross-dimensions at the end of Galaxy Angel: Eternal Lovers, a new dimension called NEUE was discovered, which is linked to EDEN through a space called ABSOLUTE, a central hub to which all dimensions are linked. This hub cannot be operated by most people however, and currently, the only person who can is the Moon Angel Troupe's Milfeulle Sakuraba. Since the operation of the hub involves opening gates between different dimensions, those with the ability to do so are called "gate keepers". The new Rune Angel Troupe features Emblem Frames from NEUE and is the successor to the now disbanded Moon Angel Troupe.

Anime
 is the anime counterpart to the Galaxy Angel II games. As with the first Galaxy Angel anime series, this one has little to nothing to do with the plot of the video games.

1° Launch! Angels Scramble-Rune
2° Super Cheap! Ground Bazaar-Rune
3° Legendary! Food Stash Survival-Rune
4° Temptation! Three o'clock Cafe Table-Rune
5° Truce! Adult's Alcohol-Rune
6° Debut! New Idol-Rune
7° Battle! Senior Is a Rival-Rune
8° Horrible! Rainy Day Call-Rune
9° Luxury! Celebrity's Way Travel-Rune
10° Attack! Combat Professional-Rune
11° Solved! A Detective's Case File-Rune
12° Boiling! Hot Spring Commercial-Rune
13° Now Appearing! Evil-Rune Angel Troupe?!

Characters
For information on the characters of Galaxy Angel II, see Galaxy Angel II characters.

Games

Galaxy Angel II: Zettai Ryōiki no Tobira

The first game, can be translated as "Door to the Absolute Area". Four years have passed since the heroe Tact Meyers and the Moon Angels defeated the Val Fask's ambition in the previous game. Now it has been found a new universe called "NEUE" and a new angel-team (all of them having some connection with the previous characters) has been formed to protect it from Verel, their new enemy, who will kidnap Milfeulle Sakuraba "the gate keeper" who is the one who can open the gate to ABSOLUTE. Most of the major cast from the original Galaxy Angel games make appearances in this game. Tact will be the new commander of Luxiole in spite of to leave as new commander of Elle Ciel to Lester Cooldaras and the new team will be led by Kazuya Shiranami the new male member.

On release, Famitsu magazine scored the game a 29 out of 40.

Theme Songs
 Opening Theme side M: "Wing of Destiny"
Artist: Maho Tomita
Lyrics/Composition/Arrangement: Noriyasu Agematsu
 Opening Theme side H: "Eternal Love 2006"
Artist: Hironobu Kageyama
Lyrics: Yuki Mori
Composition/Arrangement:  Yūsuke Sakamoto
 Ending Theme: "Cause your love ~Shiroi melody~"
Artist: Hiromi Satō
Lyrics: Bee'
Composition/Arrangement: Tatsuya Nishiwaki

Galaxy Angel II: Mugen Kairō no Kagi

The second game, can be translated as "The Key to the Infinite Corridor". Six months after the previous game is established a federation called UPW (United Parallel World). Now Tact Meyers will be promoted to a higher level and the Luxiole will have a new commander who will be Coco Nutmilk with the help of Tapio Ca. There will be introduced a new Rune Angel (similar like in "Galaxy Angel Moonlit Lovers"), others new members and there will also be small occurrences of scenes from some of the previous characters. In this plot the Rune Angel-tai will have to fight against the Arms Alliance, which is integrated by the Three Marquis and, later, against "Parfait" the main villain.

Theme Songs
 Opening Theme Ver.M: "Wing of Destiny ~Angel harp arr.~"
Artist: Maho Tomita
Lyrics/Composition: Noriyasu Agematsu
Arrangement: Hitoshi Fujima
 Opening Theme Ver.R: "Eternal Love 2007"
Artist: Ryoko Shintani
Lyrics: Yuki Mori
Composition/Arrangement: Yūsuke Sakamoto
 Ending Theme: "Salvage"
Artist: JAM Project featuring Rica Matsumoto & Masami Okui
Lyrics: Masami Okui
Composer: Monta
Arrangement: Daisuke Kikuta

Galaxy Angel II: Eigō Kaiki no Toki

The third game, can be translated as "Eternal Recurrence of the Moment"

Theme Songs
 Opening Theme Type H: "Taiyō no Aria"
Artist: Hiromi Satō
Lyrics/Composition: Noriyasu Agematsu
Arrangement: Kikuta Daisuke
 Opening Theme Type Y: "Gessei no Canon"
Artist: Yui Sakakibara
Lyrics: Noriyasu Agematsu
Composition/Arrangement: Hitoshi Fujima
 Ending Theme: "Wing of Destiny" Rune-Angel ver.
Artist: Rune-Angel
Lyrics/Composition: Noriyasu Agematsu
Arrangement: Kikuta Daisuke

Manga

Several years have passed since Milfeulle Sakuraba and the other lovely ladies of the Angel Troupe finally defeated Eonia's forces in EDEN. A new galaxy called NEUE is found, and though the troupe has officially disbanded, each of the former members works for the expansion into NEUE. Milfeulle is now the lone gatekeeper of the intergalactic "gate" that connects EDEN and NEUE. It's rumored that other gates and gatekeepers exist, and a new troupe has formed to hunt them down. Led by Kazuya Shiranami, the first male Angel, and Milfeulle's younger sister Apricot, the Rune Angel Troupe prepares for the mission to connect the two dimensions.

Due to Broccoli Books closing its doors in 2008, volumes 4-6 were never released in America.

References

External links
 BROCCOLI's official Project G.A. website 
 Official site for Angel-Rune 
 
 
 
 

2005 manga
2005 Japanese novels
2006 video games
2007 video games
2009 video games
Anime series
Bandai Entertainment anime titles
Comi Digi + manga
Galaxy Angel
Japan-exclusive video games
Light novels
PlayStation 2 games
PlayStation 2-only games
Satelight
Science fiction anime and manga
Science fiction video games
Seinen manga
Video games developed in Japan
Broccoli (company) games